Harold Becker (born September 25, 1928) is an American film and television director, producer, and photographer from New York City, associated with the New Hollywood movement and best known for his work in the thriller genre. His body of work includes films like The Onion Field, Taps, The Boost, Sea of Love, Malice, City Hall and Mercury Rising.

Biography
After studying art and photography at the Pratt Institute, Becker began his career as a still photographer, but later tried his hand at directing television commercials, short films and documentaries. Becker made his feature film debut in 1972 when he directed The Ragman's Daughter with Souter Harris.

Becker won the Mannheim-Heidelberg International Film Festival Gold Prize for his short film Ivanhoe Donaldson.

Filmography

Feature films 

The Ragman's Daughter (1972) - also producer
The Onion Field (1979)
The Black Marble (1980)
Taps (1981)
Vision Quest (1985)
The Big Town (1987)
The Boost (1988) - also co-executive producer
Sea of Love (1989)
Malice (1993) - also producer
City Hall (1996) - also producer
Mercury Rising (1998)
Domestic Disturbance (2001) - also producer
Vengeance: A Love Story (2017) - executive producer only

Documentaries 
 Blind Gary Davis (1964) - short film
Ivanhoe Donaldson (1964)
Sighet, Sighet (1967) - short film

Television 
 Masters of Science Fiction (2007, 1 episode)

Music videos 
 "Crazy for You" (1985) - Madonna
 "Gambler" (1985) - Madonna

References

External links
 Harold Becker Official Website
 
 Filmreference.com

Film producers from New York (state)
1928 births
Living people
Film directors from New York City